Airport Road is a major east–west thoroughfare in Huntsville, Alabama that connects the Jones Valley and Hampton Cove subdivisions to Memorial Parkway and the rest of the city. On average approximately 32,000 vehicles travel the 2-mile stretch of road a day.

Street Description

From the west, the road starts as the five-lane highway Johnson Road coming from Triana Boulevard heading east. At Leeman Ferry Road, Johnson Road becomes Airport Road traveling through John Hunt Park as a scenic four lane divided highway leading to Memorial Parkway. Once crossing under the Parkway, the road  crosses over a former Louisville and Nashville Railroad rail line as the travel lanes of Airport Road get narrow as the five-lane highway fits in between the many businesses down the street. Airport Road passes north of the Westbury Shopping Center and south of the Country Club apartments.

Airport Road has signalized intersections with Balmoral Drive and Queensbury Drive, both of which lead to the large Waterford Square (formerly named Queensbury) apartments complex, and Chateau Drive, which leads to a residential neighborhood. Following these intersections is Hospital Drive, which leads to Crestwood Medical Center to the north. Several churches, including Trinity United Methodist Church, run along the south side of Airport Road. Airport Road then meets Whitesburg Drive, where it travels across Garth Mountain, then runs into Jones Valley, where the road then becomes Carl T. Jones Drive.

History
Airport Road once provided direct access to the old airport from Whitesburg Drive, which was once US-231. The old airport was located west of Memorial Parkway in what is now John Hunt Park. In fact, several old runways still exist.

On November 15, 1989, a tornado destroyed much of the businesses along Airport Road including numerous houses in the heavily populated residential areas around the road. Twenty-one people died, 463 were injured, and it caused an estimated $100 million in damage.

Major intersections
Airport Road continues west as Johnson Road at the intersection of Leeman Ferry Road. The road continues as Carl T. Jones Drive in the east at the top of Garth Mountain. The road later becomes Bailey Cove Road and Green Cove Road.

Retail
Shopping centers located on Airport Road include:
 Piedmont Point Shopping Center
 The Village on Whitesburg
 Westbury Shopping Center
 Whitesburg Shopping Center, since 1990

Transportation
Shuttle buses provided by the City of Huntsville stop along Airport Road.

References

Streets in Alabama
Transportation in Huntsville, Alabama